Lake Hancock is north of Bartow, Florida in Polk County, Florida. It is ecologically important.

Lake
Lake Hancock is located in the Polk Upland area between the Winter Haven Ridge and Lakeland Ridge. As part of the upper Peace River watershed, the lake has ecological importance throughout southwest Florida according to the Southwest Florida Water Management District.

Flora and fauna
The lake is surrounded by cypress forests, with the understory primarily red maple and black willow. The open areas of the lake are relatively free from native vegetation, although hydrilla can occasionally be an issue and algae is abundant.

There is a substantial American alligator presence along the shoreline feeding on one of the largest colonial wading bird rookeries in central Florida. Although many lakes in Polk County are utilized by sports fishermen, Lake Hancock has not been used for recreational fishing in decades. The dominant fish in the lake are blue tilapia and threadfin shad, and suckermouth catfish.

Settlement history
The first settlements in the area occurred in 1849, when small farms were established in the area as a result of migration from a hurricane in the Tampa Bay area.

The slave settlement of Minatti (meaning "manatee") was established on the south shore of the lake east of Saddle Creek after the First Seminole War. Oponay, an Okmulgee Upper Creek allied with Red Stick leader Red McQueen, lived across the lake about two miles away and had peach, corn, potatoes, rice, and other crops worked by his Black slaves in the village. The settlement was destroyed by the end of the Second Seminole War in 1842. The Polk County Sheriff's Office's Burnham-McCall Training Center occupies a site in front of the former settlement site.

References

External links
 

Lakes of Polk County, Florida
Lakeland, Florida